Aker Peaks, also known as Akar Peaks or Aker Range, are a series of mainly snow-covered peaks, the highest at , extending  in a northwest–southeast direction. They were discovered on January 14, 1931, by a Norwegian whaling expedition under O. Borchgrevink, who named them after the farm of Director Svend Foyn Bruun, Sr. of the Antarctic Whaling Company at Tønsberg.

References
 

Mountains of Enderby Land